Prunus aitchisonii is a putative species of wild almond native to Afghanistan and nearby areas of Pakistan. A genetic and morphological study has shown that it is conspecific with Prunus kuramica.

References

aitchisonii
Flora of Pakistan
Flora of Afghanistan
Plants described in 1960